Jorge Miguel Dias Gonçalves (born 31 October 1983) is a Portuguese former footballer who played as a right winger.

He appeared in 98 Primeira Liga games over five seasons, scoring a total of eight goals for Leixões, Vitória de Guimarães, Olhanense and Vitória de Setúbal. He added 186 matches and 35 goals in the Segunda Liga, and also competed professionally in Spain.

Club career
Gonçalves was born in Pedroso, Vila Nova de Gaia. After having finished his youth career with Leixões SC, he went on to have stints with modest clubs before returning to Matosinhos in 2004. He would be an instrumental attacking unit from the beginning, helping to promotion from the second division into the Primeira Liga at the end of the 2006–07 season by contributing 26 games and five goals.

In 2007–08, Gonçalves scored seven league goals for Leixões – a squad-best – as the team avoided relegation in the last matchday. On 1 September 2008, the last day of the summer transfer deadline, he signed a four-year contract with La Liga side Racing de Santander for €1 million, being rarely used throughout the campaign.
 
Gonçalves returned to Portugal in June 2009, being loaned to Vitória S.C. in a season-long move. As the Minho club finished in sixth position he was irregularly used, failing to find the net in 21 competitive matches; he was subsequently released by Racing but stayed in his country, joining S.C. Olhanense.

After one final campaign in the top flight with Vitória de Setúbal, Gonçalves returned to the second tier, where he represented C.D. Feirense and Atlético Clube de Portugal. From 2015 onwards, he competed solely in his country's lower leagues.

Honours
Leixões
Segunda Liga: 2006–07

References

External links

1983 births
Living people
Sportspeople from Vila Nova de Gaia
Portuguese footballers
Association football wingers
Primeira Liga players
Liga Portugal 2 players
Segunda Divisão players
Leixões S.C. players
F.C. Pedras Rubras players
Vitória S.C. players
S.C. Olhanense players
Vitória F.C. players
C.D. Feirense players
Atlético Clube de Portugal players
F.C. Felgueiras 1932 players
AD Fafe players
S.C. Salgueiros players
La Liga players
Racing de Santander players
Portuguese expatriate footballers
Expatriate footballers in Spain
Portuguese expatriate sportspeople in Spain